Hyung-joo, also spelled Hyung-ju, is a Korean unisex given name. Its meaning differs based on the hanja used to write each syllable of the name. There are 21 hanja with the reading "hyung" and 56 hanja with the reading "joo" on the South Korean government's official list of hanja which may be registered for use in given names.

People with this name include:
Ha Hyung-joo (born 1962), South Korean male judo practitioner
Kim Hyung-ju (born 1976), South Korean male judo practitioner
Kim Hyung-joo (born 1985), South Korean female freestyle wrestler
Lim Hyung-joo (born 1986), South Korean operatic pop singer
Park Hyung-joo (born 1995), South Korean male swimmer

See also
List of Korean given names

References

Korean unisex given names